Joan Blaeu (23 September 1596 – 21 December 1673) was a Dutch cartographer born in Alkmaar, the son of cartographer Willem Blaeu.

Life 
In 1620, Blaeu became a doctor of law but he joined the work of his father. In 1635, they published the Atlas Novus (full title: Theatrum orbis terrarum, sive, Atlas novus) in two volumes. Joan and his brother Cornelius took over the studio after their father died in 1638. Blaeu became the official cartographer of the Dutch East India Company like his father before him.

Blaeu died in Amsterdam on 21 December 1673. He is buried in the Westerkerk there.

Maps 

Blaeu's world map, Nova et Accuratissima Terrarum Orbis Tabula, incorporating the discoveries of Abel Tasman, was published in 1648. This map was revolutionary in that it "depicts the solar system according to the heliocentric theories of Nicolaus Copernicus, which show the earth revolving around the sun.... Although Copernicus's groundbreaking book On the Revolutions of the Spheres had been first printed in 1543, just over a century earlier, Blaeu was the first mapmaker to incorporate this revolutionary heliocentric theory into a map of the world."

Blaeu's map was copied for the map of the world set into the pavement of the Groote Burger-Zaal of the new Amsterdam Town Hall, designed by the Dutch architect Jacob van Campen (now the Amsterdam Royal Palace), in 1655.

Blaeu's Hollandia Nova was also depicted in his Archipelagus Orientalis sive Asiaticus published in 1659 in the Kurfürsten Atlas (Atlas of the Great Elector). and used by Melchisédech Thévenot to produce his map, Hollandia Nova—Terre Australe (1664). He also published the 12-volume "Le Grand Atlas, ou Cosmographie blaviane, en laquelle est exactement descritte la terre, la mer, et le ciel". One edition is dated 1663, in folio , that contained 593 engraved maps and plates.

Around 1649, Blaeu published a collection of Dutch city maps named Toonneel der Steeden (Views of Cities). In 1651, he was voted into the Amsterdam council. In 1654, Blaeu published the first atlas of Scotland, devised by Timothy Pont.

Being fiercely competitive with his contemporary Johannes Janssonius in who could make an atlas with the higher quantity of maps, Blaeu in 1662 published the Atlas Maior, it had 11 volumes and included 600 maps. This atlas became a status symbol for those who owned it and was the most expensive book of the 17th century. A cosmology was planned as their next project, but a fire destroyed the studio completely in 1672.

See also 
 Early modern Netherlandish cartography

References

External links 

 
 
 

17th-century Dutch businesspeople
17th-century Dutch cartographers
1596 births
1673 deaths
Articles containing video clips
Dutch cartographers
Dutch East India Company people
People from Alkmaar